The Zanesville Indians (a.k.a. Zanesville Dodgers, Zanesville Cubs and Zanesville Greys) were a Minor League Baseball Team located in Zanesville, Ohio. They played in the Ohio State League and Ohio–Indiana League from 1944–1950. The team had affiliation deals with the Brooklyn Dodgers and Cleveland Indians.

Prior to World War II they played in the Middle Atlantic League from 1933–1942.

External links
Baseball Reference
Tour of Grant Municipal Stadium where the Zanesville teams played

Defunct minor league baseball teams
Zanesville, Ohio
Ohio State League teams
Cleveland Guardians minor league affiliates
Brooklyn Dodgers minor league affiliates
Chicago Cubs minor league affiliates
Boston Bees minor league affiliates
1933 establishments in Ohio
1950 disestablishments in Ohio
Baseball teams established in 1933
Baseball teams disestablished in 1950
Defunct baseball teams in Ohio
Ohio-Indiana League teams